The Lone Wolf Keeps a Date (1941) is the sixth Lone Wolf film produced by Columbia Pictures. It features Warren William, in his fourth appearance as the title character Lone Wolf, and Edward Gargan, Lester Matthews and Don Beddoe as the film's antagonists. The film was directed by Sidney Salkow and written by Salkow and Earl Felton.

The film centers on former jewel thief Michael Lanyard, also known by his alias Lone Wolf, who aims to recover his stamp collection and rescues a damsel in distress. Filming took place in August and September 1940. The Lone Wolf Keeps a Date was released in the United States in January 1941.

Plot
After adding a rare Cuban stamp to his coveted collection and admonishing his butler Jamison for winning money in a rigged dice game in Havana, retired jewel thief and unofficial private detective Michael Lanyard (the Lone Wolf), flies to Miami, meeting gorgeous Patricia Lawrence aboard the flying boat. Initially reserved, Lawrence confides in Lanyard about her troubles; one of her boyfriend Scotty's clients was killed some time ago after retaining Scotty to send a package stuffed with $100,000 in bank notes. At the Miami airport, they are ambushed by kidnappers Chimp and Mr. Lee, employees of Big Joe Brady. The Lone Wolf swiftly outruns the criminals with Lawrence. He hides the retrieved stack of money in a hotel safe, but he is discovered by Inspector Crane and his buffoonish assistant Wesley Dickens along with Miami police captain Moon. Lanyard evades capture and sets out to expose the three villains on his own. The detective also realizes that his prized stamp collection has been swiped by Big Joe Brady. He tracks them down and has them arrested. After many chases, double-crosses and switches, the Lone Wolf exonerates himself and mulls missing an important philately convention with his prize collection.

Cast

Production
The Lone Wolf title character is played by Warren William, his fourth time doing so. Although Walter Baldwin is listed in studio documents as playing a night watchman in the film, he did not actually appear in it.

Sidney Salkow directed the film for Columbia Pictures, while Salkow and Earl Felton cowrote the screenplay based on the detective character created by Louis Joseph Vance in a series of eight novels published between 1914 and 1934. Barney McGill was the film's as cinematographer, Morris Stoloff headed the musical direction and Richard Fantl edited the film. Principal photography began on August 21, 1940 and ended in mid-September 1940.

Release and reception
Through the release print lists a copyright date of 1940, the film was officially released in North American cinemas in January 1941. It is alternatively known as Revenge of the Lone Wolf and Alias the Lone Wolf. In his 2010 book Mystery Movie Series of 1940s Hollywood, Ron Backer wrote that the film "is the best of the Warren William Lone Wolf movies," although "it seems to lack that certain something that made the earlier Lone Wolf movies so entertaining." He concluded that the film made "a good entry in the Lone Wolf series, with less sexual violence this time round." In contrast, Leonard Maltin wrote in his Movie & Video Guide (1998) that the film was "listless."

References

Bibliography

External links
 
 
 
 

1940 films
American crime films
1940 crime films
Columbia Pictures films
American black-and-white films
The Lone Wolf films
Films directed by Sidney Salkow
1940s American films